Charles Randall Brown (23 December 1899 – 8 December 1983) was a United States Navy four-star admiral.

Brown was appointed to the United States Naval Academy in 1917, graduating in 1921.

In February 1924, Brown reported to Naval Air Station Pensacola for flight training. He was designated a naval aviator on 15 August 1924.

As a Vice Admiral, he commanded the United States Sixth Fleet. He became the Commander in Chief, Allied Forces Southern Europe (CINCSOUTH), 1959–1961, as a full admiral.  It was in this role in 1959 that he instigated the creation of the Gray Eagle Award.

Personal
Brown married Eleanor T. Green on 26 November 1921.

See also
List of United States Navy four-star admirals

References

Biography at Munzinger Archive (in German)

External links

Charles Randall Brown at Military Times

1899 births
1983 deaths
People from Tuscaloosa, Alabama
United States Navy personnel of World War I
United States Naval Academy alumni
United States Naval Aviators
United States Navy personnel of World War II
United States Navy admirals
Recipients of the Navy Distinguished Service Medal
Burials at the United States Naval Academy Cemetery